Patricia Blocksomis a Canadian lawyer and arbitrator with a specialization in matrimonial law.

Education and Career 
Blocksom enrolled at the University of Lethbridge in 1976 and later earned a Bachelor of Laws degree from the University of Calgary Faculty of Law in 1982. She became a partner at Dunphy Best Blocksom in 1990.

Awards and honors 

 In 2001, Blocksom was made a Fellow of the International Academy of Matrimonial Lawyers. 
 In 2006, she received the John Haynes Memorial Award from the Alberta Family Mediation Society.
 In 2011, Blocksom was inducted into the Alberta Order of Excellence.
 Blocksom was also the recipient of the 2011 Canadian Bar Association Touchstone Award.

References

Canadian women lawyers
Members of the Alberta Order of Excellence
University of Calgary alumni
University of Calgary Faculty of Law alumni
20th-century Canadian lawyers
21st-century Canadian lawyers